Kosobokovo is a rural locality (a selo) in Voykovsky Selsoviet, Shipunovsky District, Altai Krai, Russia. The population was 333 as of 2013. There are 9 streets.

Geography 
Kosobokovo is located 61 km southeast of Shipunovo (the district's administrative centre) by road. Vorobyovo is the nearest rural locality.

References 

Rural localities in Shipunovsky District